The Fall River murders were a series of three homicides that took place in Fall River, Massachusetts, from October 1979 to February 1980 allegedly by a satanic cult. It was the onset of a period in American history known as the Satanic panic.

The first murder, that of 17-year-old Doreen Levesque, was committed on the night of October 13, 1979. Her body was found under the bleachers of Diman Regional Vocational Technical High School in Fall River the following morning. No person was ever convicted of the Levesque murder.

The murder of the next victim, 19-year-old Barbara Raposa, was committed on November 7, 1979, but her body was not discovered until January 26, 1980. Andy Maltais was convicted and sentenced to life in prison without the possibility of parole for the Raposa murder.

The third murder, that of 20-year-old Karen Marsden, is thought to have been committed on February 8, 1980. Portions of her skull were discovered on April 13, 1980. Her body has never been recovered. Multiple individuals were charged in the Marsden murder, but only Carl Drew and Robin Murphy were convicted. Carl Drew was convicted at trial and sentenced to life in prison without the possibility of parole. Robin Murphy pleaded guilty to second degree murder as part of an agreement to testify on behalf of the prosecution and received a reduced sentence.

The Fall River murders are the subject of the 2021 documentary Fall River produced by Blumhouse and directed by James Buddy Day.

Doreen Levesque murder 
Doreen Ann Levesque was a 17-year-old resident of New Bedford who had left foster care and had no fixed address. On the night of her murder, she had traveled to Fall River to engage in prostitution with another sex worker, "Gail." Witnesses reported seeing Doreen being intoxicated downtown at several establishments and engaging in prostitution on Pleasant Street.

At approximately 6:00 a.m. on October 13, 1979, Doreen's body was found under the bleachers of Diman Regional Vocational Technical High School by two joggers, who were using the school's running track. She had been sexually assaulted and bludgeoned to death and was identified only after police released a composite drawing to local newspapers.

Barbara Raposa murder 
Barbara Raposa was a 19-year-old single mother with a history of drug abuse and sex work. She was reported missing on November 7, 1979, by her father after she had failed to pick up her son from a babysitter. She was last seen around 8:15 p.m. by a male friend who had dropped her off in downtown so that she could work as a prostitute.

Barbara's body was found by hunters several months later, on January 26, 1980, in a wooded area on the outskirts of Fall River. Autopsy results indicated that she was killed shortly after she had last been seen.

Karen Marsden murder 
Karen Marsden was a 20-year-old mother and sex worker in the Fall River area who had frequent contacts with police. On the night of her disappearance, police had questioned Karen as a potential witness to the murder of Doreen Levesque. On February 9, 1980, Karen refused to identify Doreen's killer, refused an offer of witness protection, and asked police to drop her off at a church in Fall River. Karen was reported missing the following day by her grandmother.

Karen's partial remains were found in Westport, Massachusetts on April 13, 1980.

References

Crimes involving Satanism or the occult
Murder in Massachusetts
Satanic ritual abuse
Serial murders in the United States
1979 murders in the United States 
1980 murders in the United States 
1970s murders in the United States 
1980s murders in the United States n